Dolenja Nemška Vas is a small settlement in the Municipality of Trebnje in eastern Slovenia. It lies on the left bank of the Temenica River, just east of Trebnje. The area is part of the historical Lower Carniola region. The municipality is now included in the Southeast Slovenia Statistical Region.

References

External links
Dolenja Nemška Vas at Geopedia

Populated places in the Municipality of Trebnje